Sherry! is a musical with a book and lyrics by James Lipton and music by Laurence Rosenthal. The musical is based on the 1939 George S. Kaufman-Moss Hart play The Man Who Came to Dinner.

In 1967, following a short run on Broadway and poor reviews, the score to Sherry! was apparently lost, until being rediscovered at the Library of Congress more than thirty years later. A studio recording based on the rediscovered score was released in 2004.

Production
George Sanders originally was signed to play Whiteside, but when his wife, actress Benita Hume, became terminally ill with cancer, he withdrew from the project. Choreographer Ron Field was replaced by Joe Layton during the Philadelphia try-out. He took over directing as well, according to Lipton, although Morton DaCosta retained credit in the program.

The production opened on Broadway at the Alvin Theatre on March 28, 1967, where it ran for 72 performances and fourteen previews. The cast included Clive Revill as Whiteside, Elizabeth Allen as Maggie, Jon Cypher as Bert, Dolores Gray as Lorraine, Eddie Lawrence as Banjo, Byron Webster as Beverly, and Cliff Hall as Dr. Bradley.

Sherry! took a gambit quite typical for musicals based on straight plays by "opening up" the story: that is, by adding scenes in locations not featured onstage in the original play. In order to "open up" The Man Who Came to Dinner (which takes place entirely in the Stanleys' living room) it was necessary to maintain the premise that Sheridan Whiteside uses a wheelchair. Therefore, the second-act climax of Sherry! moved the action to a nearby skating rink, with several characters on roller skates and Whiteside perambulating in his wheelchair.

Studio recording
Following the show's closing, the orchestrations were packed for transport to the writers' publisher, but could not be found there later.  It was believed that they had been inadvertently put on the wrong truck and, together with the sets, hauled to New Jersey and burned. More than three decades later, music producer Robert Sher discovered the trunk containing the complete score housed at the Library of Congress and contacted Lipton, who had by then achieved fame as the moderator of Bravo's Inside the Actors Studio, to propose an all-star studio recording. The result was a 2003 Angel Records 2-CD set (with cover art by Randy Souders) that was recorded in separate sessions over a period of three years, with the orchestral portions recorded in Bratislava and Prague and the vocals recorded in New York City, with extensive editing and mixing by Adam Long in St. Louis, Missouri. The recording cast includes Nathan Lane as Whiteside, Bernadette Peters as Maggie, Carol Burnett as Lorraine, Tom Wopat as Bert, Tommy Tune as Beverly, and Mike Myers as Banjo, with Lillias White, Keith David, James Lipton, Lawrence Pressman, Siobhan Fallon and Phyllis Newman in small supporting roles. The dancers include Noah Racey, who also choreographed "Putty in Your Hands" and Megan Sikora.

Synopsis
Sheridan Whiteside, an egregiously pompous and self-centered radio personality, terrorizes the family of Ernest W. Stanley of Mesalia, Ohio, when a slip on their icy front steps forces him to recuperate in their home at Christmas time. The highly critical and extremely egotistical Whiteside commandeers the household and staff and disrupts the lives of everyone who comes within his orbit, including his private secretary Maggie Cutler, journalist-playwright Bert Jefferson, Broadway diva Lorraine Sheldon, antic Harpo Marx-like comedian Banjo, bon vivant Beverly Carlton, and absent-minded physician and aspiring memoirist Dr. Bradley.

Original Broadway song list

Act I	 		 	
 In the Very Next Moment
 Why Does the Whole Damn World Adore Me?
 Maggie's Date
 Maybe It's Time for Me
 How Can You Kiss Those Good Times Goodbye?
 With This Ring
 Sherry!
 Au Revoir
 Proposal Duet
 Listen, Cosette
 Christmas Eve Broadcast

Act II	 		 	
 Putty in Your Hands
 Imagine That
 Marry the Girl Myself
 Putty in Your Hands (Reprise)
 Harriet Sedley
 Sherry! (Reprise)

Studio recording song list

Act I
 Why Does the Whole Damn World Adore Me? - Whiteside
 Whiteside's Prayer - Mrs. Stanley, Whiteside, Maggie, The Mesalians
 In the Very Next Moment - The Mesalians, John, Sarah, Maggie, Dr. Bradley, Whiteside
 Crockfield - Whiteside, The Cons, Maggie
 Maybe It's Time for Me - Maggie
 How Can You Kiss Those Good Times Goodbye? - Whiteside, Maggie
 With This Ring - Maggie, Bert, Whiteside, Dr. Bradley
 Sherry! - Lorraine, Whiteside
 Alas, Lorraine/Au Revoir - Beverley Carlton, Whiteside, Maggie
 The Proposal Duet/Listen, Cosette - Lorraine, Cosette
 I Always Stay at the Ritz - Beverly, The Railroad Porters
 Christmas Eve - Announcer, Quartet, Choir, Whiteside, Miss Preen, The Radio Crew, Sarah, John, Mrs. Stanley, Mr. Stanley

Act II
 Putty in Your Hands - Lorraine, Bert, Mesalia Barflies
 Imagine That - Maggie, Whiteside
 Preen Beguine - Banjo, Miss Preen, Whiteside
 Marry the Girl Myself - Whiteside, Banjo, Maggie
 Putty in Your Hands (Reprise) - Lorraine, Whiteside, Banjo
 Harriet Sedley - Whiteside, Banjo, Mr. Stanley
 Au Revoir (Reprise) - Whiteside, Maggie
 Whiteside's Prayer (Reprise) & Finale - Whiteside, Maggie, Bert, Dr. Bradley, The Mesalians

Critical response
The critics were unanimous in their disapproval, finding the taut Kaufman-Hart humor of the original play was diluted by the inclusion of mediocre musical numbers that were dropped into the action rather than allowed to evolve naturally from the plot.

The Billboard review noted that the musical was "a dated and disjointed affair...Except for the title song, there is nothing in the score with a step-out potential...the music lacks a melodic flow and...lyrics are routine." However, the World Journal Tribune wrote that "On the whole, Kaufman and Hart's comedy holds its own as a play and gains some entertaining embellishments in this prevailing merry musical adaptation."

In reviewing the studio cast album, John Kenrick wrote "Musical theatre buffs will not be able to resist this star-studded recreation...Nathan Lane is delicious...Bernadette Peters is perfect...and Carol Burnett sings the hell out of the show-stopping title tune".  The SF Gate review noted that "there's a delightful verve to the whole proceedings."

Notes

References
Mandelbaum, Ken. Not Since Carrie: Forty Years of Broadway Musical Flops St. Martin's Press (1991), pages 192-94

External links
 
Studio cast recording at aislesay.com
ON THE RECORD: Sherry! and Lorelei, February 8, 2004

1967 musicals
Broadway musicals
Musicals based on plays
Plays set in Ohio